The Armadini are a noctuid ("owlet") moth tribe of the subfamily Catocalinae. As numerous catocaline genera have not yet been assigned to a tribe, the genus list should be considered preliminary.

Genera
Armada Staudinger, 1884
Asplenia Hampson, 1916
Drasteriodes Hampson, 1926
Epharmottomena John, 1909
Iranada Wiltshire, 1977
Metopistis Warren, 1913
Metoponrhis Staudinger, 1888
Riadhia Wiltshire, 1961
Tarachephia Hampson, 1926

References 

 
Catocalinae